Ganisa floresiaca is a moth in the family Eupterotidae. It was described by Wolfgang A. Nässig in 2009. It is found on Flores in Indonesia. Adults have been recorded on wing from February to April.

References

Moths described in 2009
Eupterotinae